Tsaghkavan, Tavush refer to 2 places:

Verin Tsaghkavan, Tavush Province, Armenia
Nerkin Tsaghkavan, Tavush Province, Armenia